IROC XIII was the thirteenth year of IROC competition, which took place in 1989. it saw the use of the Chevrolet Camaro in all races for the final year, and continued the format introduced in IROC VIII. Race one took place on the Daytona International Speedway, race two took place at Nazareth Speedway, race three ran at Michigan International Speedway, and race four concluded the year at Watkins Glen International. Terry Labonte won the series championship and $204,900.

The roster of drivers and final points standings were as follows:

Race results

Race One, Daytona International Speedway
Friday, February 17, 1989

(5) Indicates 5 bonus points added to normal race points scored for leading the most laps.(3) Indicates 3 bonus points added to normal race points scored for leading the 2nd most laps(2) Indicates 2 bonus points added to normal race points scored for leading the 3rd most laps.

Average speed: Cautions: noneMargin of victory: 1 clLead changes: 9

Race Two, Nazareth Speedway
Saturday, April 29, 1989

(5) Indicates 5 bonus points added to normal race points scored for leading the most laps.(3) Indicates 3 bonus points added to normal race points scored for leading the 2nd most laps(2) Indicates 2 bonus points added to normal race points scored for leading the 3rd most laps.
Average speed: Cautions: 3Margin of victory: 13.45 secLead changes: 6

Lap Leader Breakdown

Race Three, Michigan International Speedway
Saturday, August 5, 1989

(5) Indicates 5 bonus points added to normal race points scored for leading the most laps.(3) Indicates 3 bonus points added to normal race points scored for leading the 2nd most laps(2) Indicates 2 bonus points added to normal race points scored for leading the 3rd most laps.

Average speed: 158.343 mphCautions: noneMargin of victory: .47 secLead changes: 8

Race Four, Watkins Glen International
Saturday, August 12, 1989

(5) Indicates 5 bonus points added to normal race points scored for leading the most laps.(3) Indicates 3 bonus points added to normal race points scored for leading the 2nd most laps(2) Indicates 2 bonus points added to normal race points scored for leading the 3rd most laps (did not occur in this race so not awarded).

Average speed: Cautions: noneMargin of victory: 1.3 secLead changes: 1

Lap Leader Breakdown

Notes
 Geoff Brabham and Rick Mears tied for tenth place in the championship standings, but Brabham was awarded the position due to a higher finishing position in the final race.
 Geoff Brabham started from the back of the field in a back up car after an accident on the first lap.

References

External links
IROC XIII History - IROC Website

International Race of Champions
1989 in American motorsport